Cipangopaludina is a genus of freshwater snails with a gill and an operculum, aquatic gastropod mollusks in the family Viviparidae.

Distribution
There are 11 species and 2 subspecies in China.

Species
Species within the genus Cipangopaludina include:
 Cipangopaludina annandalei Brandt, 1968
 Cipangopaludina aubryana (Heude, 1890)
 Cipangopaludina cathayensis (Heude, 1890)
 Cipangopaludina chinensis (Gray, 1834) - synonym: Bellamya chinensis (Reeve 1863), Cipangopaludina wingatei - Chinese mystery snail
 Cipangopaludina chinensis fluminalis (Heude, 1890)
 Cipangopaludina haasi (Prashad, 1928) - synonym: Cipangopaludina chinensis haasi Prashad, 1928
 Cipangopaludina hainanensis (Möllendorff, 1909)
 Cipangopaludina japonica (von Martens, 1861)
 Cipangopaludina latissima (Dautzenberg & H. Fischer, 1905)
 Cipangopaludina lecythoides (Benson, 1842)
 Cipangopaludina lecythis (Benson, 1836) - synonym: Cipangopaludina ampulliformis
 Cipangopaludina lecythis ampullacea (Charpentier, 1863)
 Cipangopaludina malleata (Reeve, 1863) - type species of the genus Cipangopaludina
 Cipangopaludina patris (Kobelt, 1909)
 Cipangopaludina ussuriensis (Gerstfeldt, 1859)
 Cipangopaludina ventricosa (Heude, 1890)
 Cipangopaludina zejaensis Moskvicheva, 1979

synonyms
 Cipangopaludina dianchiensis Zhang, 1990 is a synonym of Margarya dianchiensis (Zhang, 1990)
 Cipangopaludina menglaensis Zhang, Liu & Wang, 1981 is a synonym of Mekongia menglaensis (Zhang, Liu & Wang, 1981)
 Cipangopaludina yunnanensis Zhang, Liu & Wang, 1981 is a synonym of Mekongia yunnanensis (Zhang, Liu & Wang, 1981)

References

External links 
 

Viviparidae